Brania pusilla is a species of marine annelid in the family Syllidae. The original name for the species was  Exogone pusilla.

The species has a cosmopolitan distribution.

The body can be 1 mm to 2.5 mm long with 28 to 35 segments. It is suggested that parthenogenesis is a normal condition in this species. According to the Encyclopedia of Life the species is simultaneous hermaphroditic.

References 

Syllidae
Animals described in 1851